Ankahi Kahaniya is a 2021 Indian Hindi-language film directed by Abhishek Chaubey, Saket Chaudhary and Ashwiny Iyer Tiwari, written by Piyush Gupta, Hussain Haidry, Shreyas Jain, Zeenat Lakhani and Nitesh Tiwari and starring Abhishek Banerjee, Rinku Rajguru, Delzad Hiwale, Kunal Kapoor, Zoya Hussain, Nikhil Dwivedi and Palomi Ghosh. It was released by Netflix on 17 September 2021.

Cast 
 Abhishek Banerjee as Pradeep Loharia
 Rinku Rajguru as Manjari
 Delzad Hiwale as Nandu
 Kunal Kapoor as Manav
 Zoya Hussain as Tanu Mathur
 Nikhil Dwivedi as Arjun Mathur
 Palomi Ghosh as Natasha
 T.J. Bhanu as Pradeep Wife

References

External links 
 
 

2020s Hindi-language films
Hindi-language Netflix original films